The 1897 Calgary municipal election was scheduled for December 13, 1897 to elect a Mayor and nine Councillors to sit on the fourteenth Calgary City Council from January 3, 1898 to January 3, 1899. Arthur Leslie Cameron was acclaimed as mayor.

Results

Mayor
Arthur Leslie Cameron — Acclaimed

Councillors

Ward 1

Ward 2

Ward 3

School Trustee

See also
List of Calgary municipal elections

References

Sources
Frederick Hunter: THE MAYORS AND COUNCILS  OF  THE CORPORATION OF CALGARY Archived March 3, 2020

Politics of Calgary
Municipal elections in Calgary
1897 elections in Canada
1890s in Calgary